Catullus 10 is a Latin poem of thirty-four lines in Phalaecean metre by the Roman poet Catullus.

Text

Analysis 
Catullus, or the speaker, tells at his own expense how neatly he was shown up when attempting to put on airs about his supposed wealth acquired in Bithynia, whither he went in 57 BC in the retinue of the governor Memmius. According to E. T. Merrill, "the forms of expression are thoroughly colloquial." He dates the composition to about 56 BC.

In his Victorian translation of Catullus, R. F. Burton titles the poem "He meets Varus and Mistress".

References

Sources 
 Burton, Richard F.; Smithers, Leonard C., eds. (1894). The Carmina of Caius Valerius Catullus. London: Printed for the Translators: for Private Subscribers. pp. 16–19.
 Merrill, Elmer Truesdell, ed. (1893). Catullus (College Series of Latin Authors). Boston, MA: Ginn and Company. pp. xxv, xliii, 21–24.

Further reading

External links 
 C. Valerius Catullus. "Catul. 10". Carmina. Leonard C. Smithers, ed. Perseus Digital Library. Retrieved 3 March 2023.

C010
Articles containing video clips